Still Life (Talking) is an album by the Pat Metheny Group. It was released in 1987 on Geffen Records. It won the Grammy Award for Best Jazz Fusion Performance and was certified gold by the RIAA on July 2, 1992.

Track listing

Personnel
 Pat Metheny – acoustic and electric guitars, guitar synthesizer
 Lyle Mays – piano, keyboards
 Steve Rodby – acoustic and electric bass
 Paul Wertico – drums
 Armando Marçal – percussion, backing vocals
 Mark Ledford – vocals 
 David Blamires – vocals

Charts

References

Pat Metheny albums
1987 albums
Geffen Records albums
Grammy Award for Best Jazz Fusion Performance
JoJo's Bizarre Adventure songs